Silvio Cavrić (born 10 July 1985) is a Croatian footballer who most recently played as a defender or defensive midfielder for Albanian Superliga club KF Laçi.

Club career
Cavrić spent most of his professional career under contract with Dinamo Zagreb who had loaned him to a number of clubs during his career, including NK Croatia Sesvete, NK Međimurje, HNK Segesta, NK Istra, and most recently, NK Inter Zaprešić.

International career
He was also capped 41 times for Croatia's youth teams at various age levels between 2001 and 2005 and was a first-team member of the squad which won third place at the 2001 European Under-16 Championship. He also appeared in all three Croatia's matches at the 2001 Under-17 World Cup.

References

External links

1985 births
Living people
People from Sisak
Association football defenders
Croatian footballers
Croatia youth international footballers
Croatia under-21 international footballers
NK Croatia Sesvete players
NK Međimurje players
HNK Segesta players
NK Istra players
NK Inter Zaprešić players
KF Laçi players
First Football League (Croatia) players
Croatian Football League players
Kategoria Superiore players
Croatian expatriate footballers
Expatriate footballers in Albania
Croatian expatriate sportspeople in Albania